The American Indian Council of Architects and Engineers (AICAE) is a non-profit organization that promotes the development of American Indian professionals in the fields of architecture and engineering. The AICAE encourages the training, licensure and continuing education of American Indians in these professions.  As of 2020, the council has over 200 members from over 20 states in the United States. The AICAE publishes a newsletter, directory, and holds conferences semiannually.

The AICAE was founded on June 23, 1975 by a small group of American Indian professionals in Albuquerque, New Mexico. Co-founders included Louis L. Weller, a Caddo/Cherokee architect from Shiprock, New Mexico, Neal A. McCaleb, a Chickasaw engineer from Oklahoma, Denby Deegan of the Mandan, Hidatsa and Arikara Nation, and Leon W. Shirley of the Navajo Nation. Other original group founders included Charles Archumbault, Ernest Echohawk, Denis Numkena, Leroy Brown and Wakon Redbird. 

Members of the AICAE provide a full range of architectural and engineering services to a range of clients including tribes and Alaska Natives, federal agencies, state agencies and local governments.

There is an annual conference held most recently in September 2019 in Albuquerque, New Mexico.

Publications

See also
American Indian Science and Engineering Society

References

Sources

Further reading

External links
 

.
Native American organizations
American engineering organizations
Architecture organizations based in the United States
Educational organizations based in the United States
Non-profit organizations based in Arizona
Organizations based in Phoenix, Arizona
Organizations established in 1976
1976 establishments in Arizona
Charities based in Arizona
Native American engineers